Harry Gordon Heard (3 December 1920 – 19 October 1978) was an  Australian rules footballer who played with Geelong in the Victorian Football League (VFL).

Notes

External links 

1920 births
1978 deaths
Australian rules footballers from Victoria (Australia)
Geelong Football Club players